Bijou Park is a former unincorporated community now incorporated in South Lake Tahoe in El Dorado County, California. It is located east of Bijou, at an elevation of 6237 feet (1901 m).

References

Neighborhoods in South Lake Tahoe, California